Samantha Sloyan is an American actress. Sloyan is best known for her roles in In the Key of Eli, Scandal, Hush, Midnight Mass,  and Grey's Anatomy.

Early life 
 
Samantha Sloyan was born in Los Angeles County, California. She is the daughter of actors James Sloyan and Deirdre Lenihan, and has one brother, Daniel Sloyan.

Career
Sloyan first appeared the 2003 independent feature film My Life with Morrissey as a florist. She continued to appear in a few short films such as No Shoulder, Shamelove, and Autodoc. In 2009, she produced and starred in the short film Plus One. Sloyan has also guest-starred in several television series such as The Beast, The Forgotten, Law & Order: LA, and NCIS. She played a recurring role as a White House employee named Jeannine Locke in the first three seasons of Scandal. She also guest-starred in another ShondaLand production titled Private Practice in 2010. Sloyan continued to appear in smaller films, including In the Key of Eli, Tape 407, and the television movie Murder in Mexico: The Bruce Beresford-Redman Story.

In 2014, Sloyan guest-starred in four television series Castle, Parks and Recreation, Hawaii Five-0, and Rizzoli & Isles. She began a recurring role in the ShondaLand production Grey's Anatomy as Dr. Penelope Blake. She first appeared in the eleventh season episode "How to Save a Life", which included the death of lead character, Derek Shepherd, played by Patrick Dempsey. She appeared again in the 12th season, including the show's 250th episode "Guess Who's Coming to Dinner", which was mostly focused on Sloyan's character. 

In 2021, Sloyan portrayed Catholic fanatic  Beverley Keane in the miniseries Midnight Mass directed by Mike Flanagan.  

On stage, Sloyan acted at the Geffen Playhouse and the Segerstrom Center for the arts. She received the LADCC and LA Weekly awards for her performance in Munched.

Filmography

Films

Television

References

External links
 

American
Living people
American film actresses
Actresses from Los Angeles County, California
21st-century American actresses
Year of birth missing (living people)